Nadap is a village in Fejér county in central Hungary, with population of 460. Lying among low Velence Hills, it is the point of departure for sightseeing tours on the countryside. The obelisk in the vicinity, called "ancient mark of Nadap" serves as a geodetic point of reference at elevation of 173.8 m.  Mihály Vörösmarty was christened in the Catholic church of Saint Rosalia in the village, and the christening basin is still preserved in the church.

References

Gallery

External links 

Populated places in Fejér County